Imeni Tsyurupy is an urban locality (an urban-type settlement) in Voskresensky District of Moscow Oblast, Russia. Population:

Geography
The settlement is located on the Nerskaya river coast.

History
In the modern-day Imeni Tsyurupy territory there were Vanilovo, Minina and Levychino villages. 
During Ivan the Terrible’s time the owner of this land was Vasiliy Stepanovich Sobakin. Then Ugresha Monastery became it.
In 19th century Minino was incorporated in Vanilovo.

References

Urban-type settlements in Moscow Oblast